was a Japanese statesman, courtier, and politician during the Nara period. Maro established the Kyōke branch of the Fujiwara clan.

Career
Maro was a minister (sakyō no dayū) during the reign of Emperor Shōmu.
 737 (Tenpyō 9, 7th month): Maro died at age 43.  A major smallpox epidemic caused the deaths of Maro and his three brothers.

Genealogy
This member of the Fujiwara clan was the son of Fujiwara no Fuhito. Maro had three brothers: Fusasaki, Muchimaro and Umakai. These four brothers are known for having established the "four houses" of the Fujiwara.

 Father: Fujiwara no Fuhito (藤原不比等, 659–720)
 Mother: Ioe-no-iratsume (五百重娘, ?–?), former wife of Emperor Tenmu.
 Wife: Lady from the Taima clan (当麻氏)
 Daughter: Fujiwara no Momoyoshi (藤原百能, 720–782)
 Wife: name unknown, daughter of Inaba no Kimame (稲葉気豆)
 1st son: Fujiwara no Hamanari (藤原浜成, 724–790)
 Children with unknown mother:
 Son: Fujiwara no Tsunatora (藤原綱執)
 Son: Fujiwara no Katsuhito (藤原勝人)
 Possible wife: Ōtomo no Sakanoue-no-iratsume (大伴坂上郎女), daughter of Ōtomo no Yasumaro (大伴安麻呂).

Notes

References
 Brinkley, Frank and Dairoku Kikuchi. (1915). A History of the Japanese People from the Earliest Times to the End of the Meiji Era. New York: Encyclopædia Britannica. OCLC 413099
 Nussbaum, Louis-Frédéric and Käthe Roth. (2005).  Japan encyclopedia. Cambridge: Harvard University Press. ;  OCLC 58053128
 Titsingh, Isaac. (1834).  Annales des empereurs du Japon (Nihon Odai Ichiran).  Paris: Royal Asiatic Society, Oriental Translation Fund of Great Britain and Ireland. OCLC 5850691

External links
 

Fujiwara clan
695 births
737 deaths
People of Nara-period Japan
Man'yō poets
Deaths from smallpox
Infectious disease deaths in Japan